Rasbora is a genus of fish in the family Cyprinidae. They are native to freshwater habitats in South and Southeast Asia, as well as southeast China. A single species, R. gerlachi, is only known from an old specimen that reputedly originated from Africa (Cameroon), but this locality is considered doubtful.

Several species are regularly kept in aquariums. As a common English name, "rasbora" is used for many species in the genus Rasbora, as well as several species in genera Brevibora, Boraras, Megarasbora, Metzia, Microdevario, Microrasbora, Rasboroides, Rasbosoma, Sawbwa, Trigonopoma and Trigonostigma. Some of these related genera were included in the genus Rasbora in the past. In a 2007 analysis, Rasbora was found to not be a monophyletic assemblage. However Boraras and Trigonostigma were determined to be monophyletic.

Species

According to FishBase, 84 recognized species are in this genus. This differs to some extent from the treatment by Catalog of Fishes, where some of these are regarded as junior synonyms and a few others (not listed below) are recognized as valid species. 

 Rasbora adisi 
Rasbora amplistriga Kottelat, 2000
 Rasbora api Lumbantobing, 2010
 Rasbora aprotaenia C. L. Hubbs & Brittan, 1954
 Rasbora argyrotaenia (Bleeker, 1849) (Silver rasbora)
 Rasbora armitagei N. K. A. Silva, Maduwage & Pethiyagoda, 2010
 Rasbora arundinata Lumbantobing, 2014
 Rasbora ataenia Plamoottil, 2016
 Rasbora atranus Kottelat & H. H. Tan, 2011
 Rasbora atridorsalis Kottelat & X. L. Chu, 1988
 Rasbora aurotaenia Tirant, 1885 (Pale rasbora) 
 Rasbora baliensis C. L. Hubbs & Brittan, 1954
 Rasbora bankanensis (Bleeker, 1853)
 Rasbora bindumatoga Lumbantobing, 2014
 Rasbora borapetensis H. M. Smith, 1934 (Blackline rasbora)
 Rasbora borneensis Bleeker, 1860
 Rasbora bunguranensis Brittan, 1951
 Rasbora caudimaculata Volz, 1903 (Greater scissortail)
 Rasbora cephalotaenia (Bleeker, 1852)
 Rasbora chrysotaenia C. G. E. Ahl, 1937 (Goldstripe rasbora)
 Rasbora cryptica Kottelat & H. H. Tan, 2012
 Rasbora dandia (Valenciennes, 1844)
 Rasbora daniconius (F. Hamilton, 1822) (Slender rasbora)
 Rasbora dies Kottelat, 2008
 Rasbora dorsinotata Kottelat, 1988
 Rasbora dusonensis (Bleeker, 1850) (Rosefin rasbora)
 Rasbora einthovenii (Bleeker, 1851) (Brilliant rasbora)
 Rasbora elegans Volz, 1903 (Twospot rasbora)
 Rasbora ennealepis T. R. Roberts, 1989
 Rasbora everetti Boulenger, 1895
 Rasbora gerlachi C. G. E. Ahl, 1928
 Rasbora haru Lumbantobing, 2014
 Rasbora hobelmani Kottelat, 1984 (Kottelat rasbora)
 Rasbora hosii Boulenger, 1895
 Rasbora hubbsi Brittan, 1954
 Rasbora jacobsoni M. C. W. Weber & de Beaufort, 1916
 Rasbora johannae Siebert & Guiry, 1996
 Rasbora kalbarensis Kottelat, 1991 (Kalbar rasbora)
 Rasbora kalochroma (Bleeker, 1851) (Clown rasbora)
 Rasbora kluetensis Lumbantobing, 2010
 Rasbora kobonensis B. L. Chaudhuri, 1913
 Rasbora kottelati K. K. P. Lim, 1995
 Rasbora labiosa Mukerji, 1935
 Rasbora lacrimula Hadiaty & Kottelat, 2009
 Rasbora lateristriata (Bleeker, 1854) (Yellow rasbora)
 Rasbora laticlavia Siebert & P. J. Richardson, 1997
 Rasbora leptosoma (Bleeker, 1855) (Copperstripe rasbora)
 Rasbora maninjau Lumbantobing, 2014
 Rasbora marinae  H. H. Tan & Kottelat, 2020
 Rasbora meinkeni de Beaufort, 1931
 Rasbora myersi Brittan, 1954
 Rasbora naggsi N. K. A. Silva, Maduwage & Pethiyagoda, 2010
 Rasbora nematotaenia C. L. Hubbs & Brittan, 1954
 Rasbora nodulosa Lumbantobing, 2010
 Rasbora notura Kottelat, 2005
 Rasbora ornata Vishwanath & Laisram, 2005
 Rasbora patrickyapi H. H. Tan, 2009
 Rasbora paucisqualis C. G. E. Ahl, 1935 (Largescaled rasbora)
 Rasbora paviana Tirant, 1885 (Sidestripe rasbora)
 Rasbora philippina Günther, 1880 (Mindanao rasbora)
 Rasbora rasbora (F. Hamilton, 1822) (Gangetic scissortail rasbora)
 Rasbora reticulata M. C. W. Weber & de Beaufort, 1915
 Rasbora rheophila Kottelat, 2012
 Rasbora rubrodorsalis Donoso-Büchner & J. Schmidt, 1997
 Rasbora rutteni M. C. W. Weber & de Beaufort, 1916
 Rasbora sarawakensis Brittan, 1951
 Rasbora semilineata M. C. W. Weber & de Beaufort, 1916
 Rasbora septentrionalis Kottelat, 2000
 Rasbora spilotaenia C. L. Hubbs & Brittan, 1954
 Rasbora steineri Nichols & C. H. Pope, 1927 (Chinese rasbora)
 Rasbora subtilis T. R. Roberts, 1989
 Rasbora sumatrana (Bleeker, 1852)
 Rasbora tawarensis M. C. W. Weber & de Beaufort, 1916
 Rasbora taytayensis Herre, 1924
 Rasbora tobana C. G. E. Ahl, 1934 
 Rasbora tornieri C. G. E. Ahl, 1922 (Yellowtail rasbora)
 Rasbora trifasciata Popta, 1905
 Rasbora trilineata Steindachner, 1870 (Three-lined rasbora)
 Rasbora truncata Lumbantobing, 2010
 Rasbora tubbi Brittan, 1954
 Rasbora tuberculata Kottelat, 1995
 Rasbora vaillantii Popta, 1905
 Rasbora vietnamensis Vasil'eva & Vasil'ev, 2013
 Rasbora volzii Popta, 1905
 Rasbora vulcanus H. H. Tan, 1999
 Rasbora vulgaris Duncker, 1904 (Black-tip rasbora)
 Rasbora wilpita Kottelat & Pethiyagoda, 1991 (Wilpita rasbora)

References

Danios
 
Fish of Southeast Asia
Freshwater fish genera
Taxa named by Pieter Bleeker